The Very Heart of the World is the second studio album by Burning Star Core, released in April 2005 by Thin Wrist Recordings.

Track listing

Personnel
Adapted from The Very Heart of the World liner notes.
 Robery Beatty – organ (3), percussion (3), electronics (4)
 Mike Connelly – instruments (4)
 Jeremy Lesniak – percussion (2)
 Sara O'Keefe – clarinet (3)
 Mike Shiflet – instruments (4)
 Trevor Tremaine – guitar (3), drums (4)
 C. Spencer Yeh – violin

Release history

References

External links 
 
 The Very Heart of the World at Bandcamp

2005 albums
Burning Star Core albums
Instrumental albums